Khin Maung Nyunt (born 13 May 1929) is a Burmese writer and historian.

Birth and education
Khin Maung Nyunt was born in Mandalay on May 13, 1929. He joined Mandalay College in 1948, and graduated with a B.A. degree in 1952.

He obtained the position of Tutor at Yangon University in the Department of Modern History and Political Science and by 1954 obtained a B.A. from Yangon University which was followed by an M.A. a year later.

In 1956 he won a scholarship from the Myanmar government to pursue postgraduate studies overseas at the London School of Economics, where he obtained a Doctorate in International Relations in 1960.

Career
From 1961 to 1975 Khin Maung Nyunt was Senior Lecturer and Departmental Head in Mawlamyine College.

In 1976 he was transferred to the Ministry of Culture and was appointed Director-General of both the Fine and Performing Arts Department and the Myanmar Historical Research Department.

In 1982 he was appointed professor of History and of International Relations at Mandalay University.

In 1987 he was appointed Director-General of the Department of Archaeology.

Recent positions include membership of the Myanmar Historical Commission, council of University of Culture and Central Executive Committee of the Myanmar Writers and Journalists Association. He was appointed professor of History and Buddhist Art at the International Buddhist Missionary University.

He has broadcast on the English programme of Radio Myanmar, giving weekly talks on aspects of Myanmar culture.

He is the chief editor of the quarterly current affairs journal Myanmar perspectives.

Achievements
Khin Maung Nyunt has written books, stories and articles in the Burmese and English languages.

He has spoken at  international conferences on subjects such as history, education, Buddhism, culture, literature, art and archaeology.

In February 2009, he won the lifetime achievement prize at the fourth Thuta-Swesone Literary Awards.

On 31 December 2010 he was presented with the Lifetime Achievement National Literary Award.

Partial bibliography

References

Burmese writers
1929 births
20th-century Burmese historians
Academic staff of Mandalay University
University of Yangon alumni
Alumni of the London School of Economics
Living people
Recipients of the Order of the Union of Myanmar
Mandalay University alumni
Academic staff of Mawlamyine University
21st-century Burmese historians